"Ten Minutes" is a song by the Get Up Kids. The single was released as part of the Sub Pop Records Singles Club. 1300 pressings were black, with only 100 pressings of the single on clear vinyl. A re-recorded version of it appears on their album Something to Write Home About. On July 2, 2005 The Get Up Kids performed for the last time before their hiatus at the Uptown Theater in Kansas City, MO. "Ten Minutes" was the last song they played.

Track listing

Additional releases
 "Ten Minutes" was released on the band's rarities and B-sides compilation Eudora and their live album Live! @ The Granada Theater.
 "Anne Arbour" was released on the band's second EP, Red Letter Day and their rarities and B-sides compilation Eudora.
 "Ten Minutes" was re-recorded for the band's second full-length studio album Something to Write Home About.

Personnel
 Matt Pryor – vocals, guitar
 Jim Suptic – vocals, guitar
 Rob Pope – bass
 Ryan Pope – drums
 James Dewees – vocals, keyboard

References

1999 singles
The Get Up Kids songs
1999 songs
Sub Pop singles